Chow Sang Sang Holdings International Limited, or Chow Sang Sang Group, doing business as Chow Sang Sang jewelry Company Limited or Chow Sang Sang, is a jewelry company with its corporate headquarters in the Chow Sang Sang Building in Kowloon, Hong Kong. Its registered office is in the Clarendon House in Hamilton, Bermuda. and it is incorporated with limited liability in Bermuda.

Business scope
Included in the group is a precious metals wholesale business. The company operates Chow Sang Sang jewelry stores. Over 50 stores combined are in Hong Kong, Macau, and Taiwan. Another 155 stores are located in 60 cities in Mainland China.

The company's Mainland subsidiary, Chow Sang Sang (China) Company Limited, is headquartered in Tianhe District, Guangzhou.

History
Chow Sang Sang was established in Guangzhou by Mr. Chow Fang Pu (周芳譜) in 1934. When Guangzhou fell to the Japanese during the Second Sino-Japanese War, the business was relocated to Macau in 1938.

During the 1930s and the 1940s Chow Sang Sang had branches in Guangzhou, Hong Kong, Macau and Zhanjiang, the management of which were divided among Chow Fang Pu's six sons. Pursuant to his will and testament in 1946, all his descendants are entitled to use the trademark of 周生生 ("Chow Sang Sang"). As a result there are now two jewelry companies in Hong Kong bearing the name of 周生生, but no longer related to each other: C. S. S. jewelry (粵港澳湛周生生, literally 'Guangzhou-Hong Kong-Macau-Zhanjiang Chow Sang Sang'), descended from his wife's three sons; and Chow Sang Sang (周生生), reestablished in Hong Kong by his concubine's three sons in 1948.

In 1973 Chow Sang Sang was publicly listed on the Hong Kong Stock Exchange. In the year ending 31 December 2011 its total turnover was HK$17,158 million.

During the modern era, the first Mainland shop opened in Fuzhou, Fujian in 1993. In 2006 the company established its Mainland division, Chow Sang Sang (China) Company Limited; this after the Mainland government eased the process of a wholly foreign-owned enterprise gaining a business permit. By 2008 the company's main expansion strategy was focused on Mainland China; at that time it had a revenue of 9.88 billion Hong Kong dollars, or $1.27 billion U.S. dollars, and 190 locations in Hong Kong, Taiwan, Macau, and the Mainland, with over 40 of them being in Hong Kong.

In May 2013 the antitrust bureau of the Shanghai Municipal Development and Reform Commission began an investigation of Chow Sang Sang, Chow Tai Fook, an industry association, and 11 gold retailers in China over concerns about price manipulation of gold in the City of Shanghai.

References

External links

 Chow Sang Sang
 PROMESSA
 EMPHASIS

jewellery retailers of Hong Kong
Companies listed on the Hong Kong Stock Exchange
Hong Kong brands